Haapsalu is an urban municipality of Estonia, in Lääne County. It comprises the town of Haapsalu and settlements of the former parish of Ridala.

Settlements
town
Haapsalu

boroughs
Paralepa, Uuemõisa

villages
Aamse, Allika, Ammuta, Emmuvere, Erja, Espre, Haeska, Herjava, Hobulaiu, Jõõdre, Kabrametsa, Kadaka, Kaevere, Kiideva, Kiltsi, Kiviküla, Koheri, Koidu, Kolila, Kolu, Käpla, Laheva, Lannuste, Liivaküla, Litu, Lõbe, Metsaküla, Mäeküla, Mägari, Nõmme, Panga, Parila, Puiatu, Puise, Pusku, Põgari-Sassi, Rohense, Rohuküla, Rummu, Saanika, Saardu, Sepaküla, Sinalepa, Suure-Ahli, Tammiku, Tanska, Tuuru, Uneste, Uuemõisa, Valgevälja, Varni, Vilkla, Võnnu, Väike-Ahli, Vätse, Üsse

International relations

Twin towns – Sister cities

Haapsalu is twinned with:

References

External links

Lääne County
Municipalities of Estonia